The Émeraude-class submarines consisted of six submarines built for the French Navy during the first decade of the 20th century. One boat was sunk and another captured during the First World War and the survivors were scrapped after the war.

Design and description
The Émeraude class were built as part of the French Navy's 1903 building program to a Maugas single-hull design. The submarines displaced  surfaced and  submerged. Their crew numbered 2 officers and 23 enlisted men.

For surface running, the boats were powered by two Sautter-Harlé  diesel engines, each driving one propeller shaft. When submerged each propeller was driven by a 300-metric-horsepower electric motor.

Ships

See also 
List of submarines of France

Notes

Bibliography

External links

French Submarines: 1863 - Now
Sous-marins Français 1863 -  (French)

 
Submarine classes
 
Ship classes of the French Navy